White fused alumina was obtained by the crystallization of the molten Bayer alumina feedstock in an electric arc furnace. It is commonly called white fused aluminum oxide and may also be called white corundum. The manufacture of white fused alumina is resulting in γ–Al2O3 in industrial alumina powder being completely transformed to α–Al2O3. White fused alumina is white particles or a white powder, and its microstructure is transparent crystal.

Application 
Because of white fused alumina's hardness (9.0 on the Mohs scale), It is second only to diamond and silicon carbide. It is commonly used as a raw material in abrasive tools, blasting, lapping, polishing, and grinding. white fused alumina is also used in refractories and ceramic shapes laminates due to chemical stability, high melting point, etc.

The white fused alumina grit size for abrasive, significant differences exist in the measured particle size ranges defined by the different systems (e.g. FEPA, ANSI, ISO, JIS, etc.) used worldwide.

Properties

References 

Aluminium compounds
Abrasives